A prayer callus, zabiba or zebiba ( zabība, "raisin") is a callus on the forehead present in some devout praying Muslims, mainly in Egypt. Owing to its societal significance it is also known as the "devout sign". Among notable Egyptian leaders Anwar Sadat's reputation for personal piety was evidenced by a callus on his forehead from repeated prostration in prayer.

Islam requires its adherents to pray five times a day (known as salat), which involves kneeling on a prayer mat and touching the ground (or a raised piece of clay called turbah by the Shia) with one's forehead. When done firmly for extended periods of time, a callus – the "prayer bump" –  can develop on the forehead which may be considered as a sign of piety and dedication. It  is mentioned in the Quran as:  

Some Muslims also believe that on the Day of Resurrection, this callus will fluoresce with an immense white light. However, riya (showing-off) is prohibited in Islam; if the prayer bump may result in riya, it is recommended  to take precautionary measures to stop a bump forming, as worship may be deemed void due to riya. 

In extreme cases, the callus can be thick enough to create a noticeable bump that protrudes from the forehead.

References

External links
 Reference to a prayer bump in 'Men, Women and God(s)'
 Mention of a prayer scar in Middle East Report
 Mention of a prayer scar in Occupation Magazine

Salah
Symptoms
Skin
Human head and neck